Gaspar Castellano y de Gastón (18 May 1928 – 21 April 2019) was a Spanish politician who belonged to the Union of the Democratic Centre (UCD) and who served as President of the Government of Aragon, one of the Spanish regional administrations, from 1981 to 1982.

References

1928 births
2019 deaths
Presidents of the Government of Aragon
Union of the Democratic Centre (Spain) politicians